"Young'n (Holla Back)" is the second single from Fabolous' debut album Ghetto Fabolous. It peaked at number thirty-three on the Billboard Hot 100 and number seventeen on the Hot R&B/Hip-Hop Singles & Tracks. The song was also used in much promotion material for the popular video game Need For Speed: Underground, and was featured as soundtrack in the game's demo but was seemingly removed from the final cut.

Charts

Weekly charts

Year-end charts

References

2001 singles
Fabolous songs
2001 songs
Song recordings produced by the Neptunes
Elektra Records singles